André Vandewyer was a Belgian footballer and coach born 21 June 1909 in Tirlemont (Belgium), died 22 October 1992 in Tirlemont.

Biography 
Vandewyer begins to football in his own town by RRC Tirlemont in 1924 and make his debut in 1926 in second division. After five years he move to Union SG. He was goalkeeper for the legendary Union Saint-Gilloise team: the famous Union 60 were unbeaten in Division 1 for 60 matches, with three consecutive titles in this period, between 9 January 1933 (Union-Lierse SK, 2–2) and 10 February 1935 (Daring Bruxelles-Union 2–0).

He also played for Belgium, five times between 1933 and 1934, including one game at the Italy World Cup.

After the war, he became coach of Union Saint-Gilloise. He was also manager of the Belgian team after Doug Livingstone, from January 1955 until June 1957.

Honours 
 Belgian international from 1933 to 1934 (5 caps)
 1st cap: 26 November 33 Belgium-Denmark 2–2 (friendly)
 Participation in the 1934 Italy World Cup (3 matches)
 Picked for the 1938 France World Cup
 Champion of Belgium in 1933, 1934 and 1935 with R. Union Saint-Gilloise
 185 matches in Division 1

References

External links
 

1909 births
1992 deaths
Belgian footballers
Belgium international footballers
1934 FIFA World Cup players
1938 FIFA World Cup players
Royale Union Saint-Gilloise players
Belgian football managers
Royale Union Saint-Gilloise managers
Belgium national football team managers
Association football goalkeepers
People from Tienen
Footballers from Flemish Brabant